Harry P. Litman (born c. 1958) is an American lawyer, law professor and political commentator. He is a former U.S. Attorney and Deputy Assistant Attorney General. He has provided commentary in print and broadcast news and produces the Talking Feds podcast. He has taught in multiple law schools and schools of public policy.  

Litman served as a law clerk to Abner Mikva, Thurgood Marshall, and Anthony Kennedy. His practice specialties have included False Claims law and Whistleblower law.

Early life and education 

Litman grew up in the Shadyside neighborhood of Pittsburgh, Pennsylvania, and was named a Presidential Scholar upon graduation from high school in 1976. Both his parents, Roslyn Litman and S. David Litman, were lawyers as well as civil liberties advocates. He received his Bachelor of Arts from Harvard College in 1980; during his studies he worked as a sports reporter for the Associated Press and as a production assistant. 

He received his Juris Doctor from the University of California at Berkeley in 1986, where he was editor-in-chief of the California Law Review and graduated Order of the Coif.

Career 

Litman served as a law clerk to Abner Mikva of the U.S. Court of Appeals for the D.C. Circuit; and Supreme Court Justices Thurgood Marshall and Anthony Kennedy during the 19881989 term.

Following his clerkships, Litman became an Assistant United States Attorney for the Northern District of California. While an Assistant U.S. Attorney, he was detailed to the Department of Justice's main office in Washington, D.C., to work on several national cases, including the federal re-prosecution of the Los Angeles police officers in the Rodney King case.

From 1993 to 1998 he was a Deputy Assistant Attorney General under Janet Reno in the Department of Justice, coordinating the department's work on a number of issues and advising the Attorney General and other officials on questions of constitutional law and prosecutorial policy. Simultaneously, he was a Special Assistant U.S. Attorney for the Eastern District of Virginia. In that capacity, he was co-counsel for Operation Underhand, prosecuting a narcotics ring that smuggled drugs into prison under the guise of providing religious counseling.

In 1998, he was appointed U.S. Attorney for the Western District of Pennsylvania by President Bill Clinton. As U.S. Attorney, Litman in 1999 announced that the office would not charge the five officers involved in the killing of Jonny Gammage.

Litman in 2000 personally litigated a gun trafficking case under Operation Target. In July 2000, Clinton nominated Litman for a judgeship on the United States District Court for the Western District of Pennsylvania, but the Senate adjourned without considering the nomination. While in government, Litman also taught at Berkeley Law School, Georgetown Law School and the University of Pittsburgh School of Law.

Litman served as Pennsylvania state counsel to the Kerry-Edwards campaign in 2004 and post-election counsel for Western Pennsylvania to the Obama-Biden presidential campaign in 2008.

As of 2020 Litman was associated with the law firm Constantine Cannon in San Francisco, where he focuses on False Claims Act cases.

Other activities

Legal commentary 
Litman is the legal affairs columnist for the Los Angeles Times. He previously wrote for The Washington Post. He has provided commentary for MSNBC, CNN and Fox News.

Teaching 
As of 2018 Litman taught Constitutional Law and National Security Law at UCLA School of Law and University of California, San Diego School of Political Science. He previously taught at Berkeley Law School, Georgetown Law School, University of Pittsburgh School of Law, Princeton's School of Public Policy, Rutgers University–Camden Law School and at Duquesne.

Talking Feds podcast 
In March 2019, Litman launched the podcast Talking Feds, a round-table of former federal officials discussing the legal issues of the day. Litman serves as host and executive producer. In March 2020 Marie Claire named it the second-best political podcast in the US to prepare listeners for the upcoming presidential election.

Personal life 
Litman lives in La Jolla with his wife Julie Roskies Litman and their three children.   Litman's sister, Jessica Litman, is a lawyer and copyright scholar at the University of Michigan. His mother was attorney Roslyn Litman. He is a member of the Democratic Party.

See also 
 List of law clerks of the Supreme Court of the United States (Seat 1)
 List of law clerks of the Supreme Court of the United States (Seat 10)

References

American political commentators
Harvard University alumni
UC Berkeley School of Law alumni
1950s births
Living people
United States Attorneys for the Western District of Pennsylvania
UCLA School of Law faculty
Law clerks of the Supreme Court of the United States
Assistant United States Attorneys
Rutgers School of Law–Camden faculty